Luinga is a town and commune of Angola, located in the province of Cuanza Norte. It covers an area of approximately 1,140 square kilometers and, in 2014, had a population density of 13.25 people per square kilometer. The most recent census states the population stands at 15,103

See also 

 Communes of Angola

References 

Populated places in Cuanza Norte Province
Communes in Cuanza Norte Province